Al-Isrāʾ (The Night Journey), also known as Banī Isrāʾīl (The Children of Israel) is the 17th chapter (sūrah) of the Quran, with 111 verses (āyāt). The word  refers to the "night journey" of the prophet Muhammad. This sura is part of a series al-Musabbihat surahs because it begins with the glorification of God.

Regarding the timing and contextual background of the believed revelation (asbāb al-nuzūl), it is an earlier "Meccan surah", which means it is believed to have been revealed in Mecca, instead of later in Medina.

Summary
1  God praised for the night-journey
2  The law of Moses a direction to the Israelites
3  Noah’s gratitude commended to his posterity
4-8  The double sin of Israel and its punishment
9-11  The Quran a direction to both the faithful and the unbelievers
12  Men inconsiderate in their prayers
13  The night and day are signs to men
14  Every man’s fate bound about his neck
14-15  God will give every man the record of his life at the judgment day
16  No nation left without an apostle
17-18  The cities destroyed which rejected their apostles
19-21  Rewards and punishments of the faithful and unbelieving
22  Degrees of honour belong to the life to come
23-24  Men should worship only one God
24-27  Kindness to be shown to parents, the poor, and the stranger
28-29  	Extravagance forbidden
30-31   Those unable to contribute for the support of the poor may help them by speaking kindly to them
32  Stinginess and foolish extravagance forbidden
33-35 Infanticide, fornication, and murder forbidden
35  The murdered man to be avenged
36  The substance of the orphan to be sacredly preserved
37-40  Men should lead lives of honesty and humility
41  God not to be dishonoured by idol-worship
42  Angels not daughters of God
43  Various warnings for the Quraish
44-45  A plurality of gods would lead to rebellion in heaven
46  All things praise God
47-49  The Quraish are judicially blinded to the Quran
50  Muhammad called a madman
51-53  The Quraish reject the doctrine of the resurrection
54  The dead when raised will fancy they have been dead but a little while
55-56  Idolaters and unbelievers to be mildly treated
57  Some prophets peculiarly favoured
58-59  The false gods need divine protection
60  Every city to be destroyed before the judgment-day
61  Muhammad not allowed to work miracles because of the unbelief of former tribes
62  The night-journey and the Zakkum tree causes of contention
63-64  Iblís disobeys God, and is cursed in consequence
65-66 He receives permission to delude men
67  He shall have no power over God’s servants
68  God protects the merchant while on the sea
69 Idolaters forget their idols in times of danger 69 ۞ 71  They are ungrateful
72  The special privileges of mankind
73-74 In the judgment all shall be fairly judged
75-77  Muhammad almost seduced from Islam
78-79  The unbelievers almost persuade Muhammad to leave them
80-82  Exhortation to prayer
83-84  The truth of the Quran to be proclaimed
85 Man’s perversity seen both in prosperity and adversity
86  The spirit created of God
87-89  Revelation (inspiration) a peculiar favour from God to Muhammad
90  Men and genii could not produce a book like the Quran
91-95  Muhammad excuses his inability to work miracles
96-98  Men appointed messengers for men and angels for angels
99-100 The dreadful fate of the idolaters at the resurrection
101  God is able to raise the dead
102  Man covetous even in respect to God’s mercy
103-104  The nine signs of Moses fail to convince Pharaoh
105  Pharaoh destroyed
106  The children of Israel succeed Pharaoh in his possession of the land of Egypt
107  Why the Quran was revealed in stages
108 ۩ 109  Some Jews and Christians believe on the Quran
110  God and the Merciful the same
111  God hath neither son nor partner

Exegesis

1 The transportation of Muhammad to "the farthest Mosque". 

This surah takes its name from the first verse which, in Islamic tradition, tells the event of the Isra, the transportation of Muhammad during the night from the Great Mosque of Mecca to what is referred to as "the farthest Mosque". The exact location is not specified in the Quran  but this is commonly taken to be the Noble Sanctuary (Temple Mount) in Jerusalem. Some scholars disagree about this (see Isra and Mi'raj). While the city of Jerusalem (or al Quds) is not mentioned by name anywhere in the Qur'an, it is identified in various Hadith. The first verse refers to Mohammed being taken from the 'Sacred Mosque' to the 'Farthest Mosque':

Within Islam, it is generally agreed upon that the 'Farthest Mosque' refers to Masjid al-Aqsa (i.e. the Temple Mount) in Jerusalem, despite it being built many years after Mohammed's death, and the 'Sacred Mosque' refers to Masjid al-Haram. The surah also refers to the other prophets, for example, Musa (Moses).

This Meccan surah was revealed in the last year before the Hijra. Like all the Meccan surah, it stresses the oneness of Allah, the authority of the prophets. However, the primary theme of the Surah is salah (daily prayers), whose number is said to have been fixed at five during the Miraj which it alludes to. In addition, the Surah forbids adultery, calls for respect for father and mother, and calls for patience and control in the face of the persecutions the Muslim community was facing at the time.

8 Hell 
Verse 17:8 refers to hell and states that those who reject the faith will be punished:

However, it also states that Allah is merciful and could forgive.

It also refers to the hereafter and states that there is a punishment for not believing in it (Verse 7:10):

13-15 Day of Judgement 
Verses 17:13 to 17:15 tells that fate is in people's hands and tells that what they do will be rewarded or punished for on the Day of Judgement.

26  Verse of Dhul Qurba 

  
The verse relates to the controversies of the land of Fadak in modern-day Saudi Arabia.

70 Aliens 
۞ Verse 17:70 tells that mankind has been given a position "above many of those whom we created" The usage of the word many in lieu of all here indicates that there are other races superior to human beings. It also may imply the possible existence of alien life, excluding angels and jinns.

71 Day of Judgement 
Verse 17:71 contains a reference to Yawm al-Qiyamah, the Day of Judgement:

In Kitab al-Kafi, Imam Ja'far al-Sadiq was questioned on the interpretation of 17:71 ("On that day, We will call forth every people with their Imam...") to which he responded it is the Imam that is with them and he is the Mahdi, al-Qa'im of the people of that time.

104 Children of Israel 
Verse 17:104 'And We said thereafter unto the Children of Israel, “Dwell in the land. And when the promise of the Hereafter comes to pass, We shall bring you as a mixed assembly.”'

Al-Tabari (d.923) suggested this referred to Palestinian settlement. Al-Zamakhshari (d. 1144) suggested this referred to Egypt devoid of Pharaoh. Al-Qurtubi (d. 1272) suggested both.

References

External links 
Quran 17 Clear Quran translation
Q17:104, 50+ translations, islamawakened.com

 
Islam and Judaism